Georgios Athanasiadis–Novas (February 9, 1893 – August 10, 1987) was a Greek poet, lawyer and politician who briefly served as Prime Minister in 1965.

Biography 
Born in Nafpaktos, he obtained his law degree from the University of Athens. He was first elected to the Greek Parliament in 1926 representing his native prefecture of Aetolia-Acarnania, and was repeatedly elected to office until 1964.

A lawyer by trade, he served as Minister for the Interior in 1945, Minister for Education in 1950 and Minister for Industry in 1951.

In 1961, however, he was one of many conservatives who joined the Center Union (EK), in opposition to the corruption of right-wing governments at the time. In 1964, after EK came into power, he became Speaker of the Greek Parliament.

On July 15, 1965 he was appointed Prime Minister of Greece by king Constantine II, after the latter dismissed Georgios Papandreou, a move that is known as Apostasia of 1965. He was followed by many EK conservatives and with support from conservative National Radical Union MPs tried to form a government, but failed to get past a vote of confidence in parliament. He was replaced on August 20 of the same year.

In July 1974 he was one of the politicians who brokered the end of the Regime of the Colonels and the appointment of Constantine Karamanlis as Prime Minister.

Athanasiadis-Novas also wrote some poetry and prose under the pen name Georgios Athanas (Γεώργιος Αθάνας). Literary critics found very little in the way of value in his works, but he found some popularity among his detractors, who used them to ridicule his less-than-distinguished political career. The stanza:

Itan ta stithia sou
aspra san galata
kai mou 'leges:gargala taYour breasts were
White as milk
And you urged me
"Tickle them!"

gained him the comical nickname "Gargalatas", Tickler. Only after 40 years has it been proven that the fact that he wrote this stanza was an urban legend. It all started from an article of Costas Stamatiou at the newspaper Ta Nea'', with the intention to ridicule him. Lefteris Papadopoulos cleared up the situation with an article at the same newspaper in 2004.

He died in Athens on August 10, 1987, aged 94.

See also 
 Apostasia of 1965

Notes 

1893 births
1987 deaths
20th-century prime ministers of Greece
20th-century journalists
People from Nafpaktos
Freethinkers' Party politicians
Liberal Party (Greece) politicians
Liberal Democratic Union (Greece) politicians
Centre Union politicians
Apostasia of 1965
Prime Ministers of Greece
Ministers of the Interior of Greece
Speakers of the Hellenic Parliament
Greek MPs 1926–1928
Greek MPs 1928–1932
Greek MPs 1932–1933
Greek MPs 1933–1935
Greek MPs 1936
Greek MPs 1946–1950
Greek MPs 1950–1951
Greek MPs 1951–1952
Greek MPs 1952–1956
Greek MPs 1956–1958
Greek MPs 1958–1961
Greek MPs 1961–1963
Greek MPs 1963–1964
Greek MPs 1964–1967
Greek journalists
Members of the Academy of Athens (modern)
National and Kapodistrian University of Athens alumni